Mecklenburgische Seenplatte II – Landkreis Rostock III (English: Mecklenburg Lake District II - Rostock District III) is an electoral constituency (German: Wahlkreis) represented in the Bundestag. It elects one member via first-past-the-post voting. Under the current constituency numbering system, it is designated as constituency 17. It is located in central Mecklenburg-Vorpommern, comprising the most of the Mecklenburgische Seenplatte district and the southern part of the Landkreis Rostock district.

Mecklenburgische Seenplatte II – Landkreis Rostock III was created for the 2002 federal election. Since 2021, it has been represented by Johannes Arlt of the Social Democratic Party (SPD).

Geography
Mecklenburgische Seenplatte II – Landkreis Rostock III is located in central Mecklenburg-Vorpommern. As of the 2021 federal election, it comprises all of the Mecklenburgische Seenplatte district with the exception of the municipalities of Feldberger Seenlandschaft and Neubrandenburg and the Ämter of Friedland, Neverin, Stargarder Land, and Woldegk, as well as the municipalities of Güstrow and Teterow and the Ämter of Bützow Land, Gnoien, Güstrow-Land, Krakow am See, Laage, and Mecklenburgische Schweiz from the Landkreis Rostock district. It is the largest federal constituency by area in Germany.

History
Mecklenburgische Seenplatte II – Landkreis Rostock III was created in 2002, then known as Bad Doberan – Güstrow – Müritz. It contained parts of the abolished constituencies of Wismar – Gadebusch – Grevesmühlen – Doberan – Bützow, Güstrow – Sternberg – Lübz – Parchim – Ludwigslust, Rostock-Land – Ribnitz-Damgarten – Teterow – Malchin, Neubrandenburg – Altentreptow – Waren – Röbel, and Neustrelitz – Strasburg – Pasewalk – Ueckermünde – Anklam. Originally, it comprised the now-abolished districts of Güstrow, Müritz, and Bad Doberan. In the 2005 election, it lost the municipalities of Graal-Müritz and Sanitz and the Ämter of Carbäk, Rostocker Heide, and Tessin from the Bad Doberan district. In the 2013 election, it lost the remainder of its territory from the former Bad Doberan district, while expanding to cover most of the newly-formed Mecklenburgische Seenplatte district. It also acquired its current name.

Members
The constituency was held by the Social Democratic Party (SPD) from its creation in 2002 until 2009, during which time it was represented by Dirk Manzewski. It was won by the Christian Democratic Union (CDU) in 2009, and represented by Eckhardt Rehberg. He was re-elected in 2013 and 2017. The constituency was won by Johannes Arlt in 2021.

Election results

2021 election

2017 election

2013 election

2009 election

References

Federal electoral districts in Mecklenburg-Western Pomerania
2013 establishments in Germany
Constituencies established in 2013